Kurixalus eiffingeri (Eiffinger's Tree Frog) is a species of frog in the family Rhacophoridae. It is found in Taiwan and on the Yaeyama Islands of Japan. Its natural habitats are subtropical or tropical moist lowland forests and subtropical or tropical moist montane forests.
It is threatened by habitat loss.

Kurixalus eiffingeri is a small to medium size frog. They breed in tree holes and bamboo stumps. Tadpoles are oophagous, and female frogs lay trophic eggs to feed their young.

References

Kurixalus
Amphibians of Japan
Amphibians of Taiwan
Taxonomy articles created by Polbot
Amphibians described in 1895